The A4W reactor is a naval reactor used by the United States Navy to propel warships and generate onboard electricity. 

The A4W designation stands for:

 A = Aircraft carrier platform
 4 = Contractor's fourth core design generation
 W = Westinghouse, the contracted designer

History 
These nuclear fission pressurized water reactors (PWRs) were jointly designed by Bettis Atomic Power Laboratory and Knolls Atomic Power Laboratory and built by Westinghouse Electric Company. Their reactor cores are expected to operate for about 25 years before refueling is required. The only ships to use these nuclear reactors are the Nimitz-class supercarriers, which have two reactors rated at 550 MWth each. These generate enough steam to produce 140,000 shaft horsepower (104 MW) for each pair of the ship's four shafts – two per propulsion plant – plus approximately 100 MW of electricity.

See also
 A1B reactor
 Nimitz-class aircraft carrier

References

External links 
  (correcting for the power output from 500 megawatts to 105.)

United States naval reactors
Pressurized water reactors